Ireland national hockey team may refer to:

 Ireland men's national field hockey team
 Ireland women's national field hockey team
 Ireland men's national ice hockey team
 Ireland women's national ice hockey team